The Lycée André Malraux is a French international school in Rabat, Morocco. It was established in 1997 and is part of the Mission laïque française OSUI network. It serves levels maternelle (preschool) through terminale, the final year of lycée (senior high school) and it allows French, English and Arabic languages learning from preschool for all children. As of 2017 the school has about 1,800 students that range in age from 3 to 18 in two different campuses.

See also
 Agency for French Education Abroad
 Education in France
 International school
 List of international schools
 Mission laïque française
 Multilingualism
 André Malraux

References

External links
 
 

French international schools in Morocco
International schools in Rabat
Trilingual schools
Cambridge schools in Morocco
Educational institutions established in 1997
1997 establishments in Morocco
AEFE contracted schools
Mission laïque française
20th-century architecture in Morocco